Dumela (Sotho Translation: Hello) is the seventh studio album of South African hip hop artist Hip Hop Pantsula, released under the CCP/EMI S.A. label in November 2009 in South Africa.

Reception
This album sold 919 00 in its first week of sales. It was released in double-disc format and featured a variety of African artists, including Naeto C from Nigeria, Nazizi from Kenya, Zubz from Zimbabwe, and Tumi Molekane, a fellow South African. The first disc, dubbed "Hip Hop", also featured the legendary American rapper Nas.

Track listing

Disc 1: Hip Hop
 Dumela
 Ancestors
 Keledimo ft Nas
 Make Monyeke
 Mpitse
 Boogie Down ft Naeto C & Ameen
 Waiting Is Over ft Whosane
 Mmago Rrago ft Supa & KG
 Nkatumela
 Daraja ft Naziz
 Kea Popa ft Notshi & Elemente
 Let The Beat Go ft Tumi, Zubz & DJ Nana
 Two Witnesses ft Molemi
 Respect

Disc 2: Pantsula
 Bongwana Mageng Majimbo
 Platinum Visa ft Towdee Bakae (Top Dog)
 Dankie Siyabonga ft Howza
 Wamo Tseba Mtho ft Cassper Nyovest & Thasman
 Show Dem with JR
 Akhonto (Remix) ft Maxhoba
 Good God Day
 Cnr Soul & Love with Jimmy Dludlu
 Motswako Music
 Achuz Wam ft Malamesh
 Killowatt (Dubmix)

References

Hip Hop Pantsula albums
2010 albums